Moriaen (also spelled Moriaan, Morien) is a 13th-century Arthurian romance in Middle Dutch. A 4,720-line version is preserved in the vast Lancelot Compilation, and a short fragment exists at the Royal Library at Brussels. The work tells the story of Morien, the Moorish son of Aglovale, one of King Arthur's Knights of the Round Table.

Plot
The romance begins with the story of Morien's conception. While searching for Lancelot thirteen years prior, Aglovale had travelled through the Moorish lands and fallen in love with a beautiful princess. They pledged their betrothal, but refusing to abandon his quest before Lancelot was located, Aglovale left the country before they could marry. He left her pregnant with his son Morien, who would grow into a tall, handsome youth "black of face and limb." Of his prowess, the romance says that Sir Morien's "blows were so mighty; did a spear fly towards him, to harm him, it troubled him no whit, but he smote it in twain as if it were a reed; naught might endure before him." Of his dress, it says that "[h]is shield and his armour were even those of a Moor, and black as a raven."

The narrative proper begins years later, as Morien seeks his father, he and his mother having been disinherited from their lands. The action takes place just prior to the quest for the Holy Grail, and the knights Lancelot and Gawain are out searching for Percival, a new knight and the brother of Aglovale. After Morien tells his story to Lancelot and Gawain, who promise to help him find his father, the knights go on a series of adventures showcasing their talents. In the end father and son are reunited, and Aglovale travels to the land of the Moors to marry his lover and win back her rightful lands.

The author tries to synchronise the romance with episodes from Chrétien de Troyes's Perceval, the Story of the Grail and the Lancelot-Grail. He or she notes at the beginning that some versions of the story have Percival himself as Morien's father, but decides to follow convention that Percival died a virgin. The circumstances of Sir Morien's birth are similar to Gahmuret and Belacane's conception of Feirefiz in Wolfram von Eschenbach's Parzival; like the Lancelot Compilation, Parzival is also based on an earlier version of the Grail story. In this case, Gahmuret is Parzival's father, making the half-Saracen Fierefiz the Grail knight's brother rather than his nephew or son.

Notes

References

Lacy, Norris J. (Ed.) (1991). The New Arthurian Encyclopedia. New York: Garland. .

Weston, Jessie Laidlay (translator). (1901). Morien: A Metrical Romance Rendered into English from the Middle Dutch. London: Nutt.
Weston, Jessie Laidlay (translator). "Morien". Ancienttexts.org. Retrieved 16 July 2006.
Wolfram von Eschenbach; Hatto, A. T. (translator) (1980). Parzival. New York: Penguin Books. .

External links
Moriaen (original text in Middle Dutch) at the Digital Library for Dutch Literature
Moriaen (translation by Jessie L. Weston) at In parentheses

13th-century books
Arthurian characters
Arthurian literature in Dutch
Black people in European folklore
Fictional African people
Knights of the Round Table
Middle Dutch literature